Archibald Charles Rudd (1887 – 12 November 1957) was an English professional footballer who played as a full-back.

References

1887 births
1957 deaths
Footballers from Nottingham
English footballers
Association football fullbacks
Nottingham Olympic F.C. players
Grimsby Town F.C. players
English Football League players